The 1935–36 Irish Cup was the 56th edition of the premier knock-out cup competition in Northern Irish football. 

Linfield won the tournament for the 19th time, defeating Derry City 2–1 in the replay at Celtic Park, after the previous match had finished in a draw.

Results

First round

|}

Replay

|}

Second replay

|}

Quarter-finals

|}

Replay

|}

Second replay

|}

Third replay

|}

Semi-finals

|}

Final

Replay

References

External links
 Northern Ireland Cup Finals. Rec.Sport.Soccer Statistics Foundation (RSSSF)

Irish Cup seasons
1935–36 domestic association football cups
1935–36 in Northern Ireland association football